Malik Sanchez (also known online as Smooth Sanchez) (born 2001) is an American streamer, YouTuber, and self-identified incel, who in April 2021 was arrested on one count of conveying false and misleading information and hoaxes, after he allegedly made a hoax threat to detonate a bomb at a restaurant in the Flatiron District of Manhattan in February 2021. He later pleaded guilty to the charges.

Streaming career 
In a Justice Department press release, Sanchez was said to be a self-identified incel whose videos included him harassing, threatening, and at one time harming individuals who he encountered in Manhattan. In one stream he also stated that he supported Elliot Rodger and said Rodger's victims "deserved to be run over and hit by a truck."

In June 2020, Sanchez created outrage in American conservative circles after he had women appear on their knees in a show of solidarity for George Floyd and asked them to apologize for their white privilege and for being complicit for human rights abuses against blacks in the United States. During that livestream Sanchez falsely identified himself as a representative of Black Lives Matter. Conservative viewers called the stream "racist against whites" and called Sanchez “bully.” With Tucker Carlson calling the stream  "an example of the “mob seeking the total humiliation of its enemies.”" Sanchez later said he did the stream to troll people.

In October 2020, Sanchez scaled the Queensboro Bridge for a livestream and the event was televised on news stations, gaining him mass popularity. At the end of the stream he was arrested and charged with reckless endangerment and criminal trespass. Sanchez was also charged with illegal possession of pepper spray after police linked him to an attack where he allegedly pepper-sprayed a 40-year-old woman in Chelsea, Manhattan.

In March 2021 Sanchez was arrested after he posted a video where he approached women in an outdoor seating area, where he stated his support for incels and Elliot Rodger, while also making hand gestures mimicking pointing a gun. After multiple people told him to stop, Sanchez pepper sprayed one of them.

2021 arrest 
In April 2021, Sanchez was arrested on one count of conveying false and misleading information and hoaxes, after he allegedly made a hoax threat to detonate a bomb at a restaurant in the Flatiron District of Manhattan in February 2021. In November 2021 Sanchez pleaded guilty to the charges. He has not streamed since April.

On April 6, 2022, Sanchez was sentenced to three years of supervised release.

References 

People charged with fraud
Living people
American YouTubers
People from New York City
Date of birth uncertain
Manosphere
Year of birth uncertain
2001 births
Incel-related violence